Goran Ljubojević (born 4 May 1983) is a Croatian former footballer who played as a forward.

Club career

As one of the best young national team players, he was transferred at the end of August 2006 from Dinamo Zagreb to KRC Genk. He also played for NK Osijek and FC St. Gallen.

In the 2006–07 season, he earned a season record of five goals in five following games. In total, he made 11 goals for KRC Genk, according to his playing time he was the most efficient scorer in the Belgian Jupiler League of that season.

In December 2009, he turned a new page in his career by signing with NK Zagreb. He scored six goals in a half season. This opened the eyes of several teams who were interested in this targetstriker. Odense and AIK showed the most interest. Finally, AIK signed him in July 2010.

"Ljubo" also was a member of the Croatian national team under 21. His highlight was a victory over England on 13 August 2003, which Croatia won by 0–3. Ljubojević scored the first two goals and delivered the assist for the third goal.

In 2014, he joined Balestier Khalsa as their first ever marquee signing. He scored the first goal in the 2014 Singapore Cup on 7 November 2014 and the club's maiden win in the Singapore Cup. He ended the season as a club top scorer with 27 goals.

He last played for NK Trnje based in the city of Zagreb.

Honours

Club
Balestier Khalsa
 Singapore Cup: 2014

KRC GENK
 Beker van Belgie: 2009

DINAMO ZAGREB
 Croatian League Champions: 2005–2006

Individual
 Top goalscorers by season of Balestier Khalsa: 2014

References

External links
 

1983 births
Living people
Sportspeople from Osijek
Association football forwards
Croatian footballers
Croatia youth international footballers
Croatia under-21 international footballers
NK Osijek players
GNK Dinamo Zagreb players
FC St. Gallen players
K.R.C. Genk players
NK Zagreb players
AIK Fotboll players
ASA 2013 Târgu Mureș players
Naft Tehran F.C. players
Balestier Khalsa FC players
Sriwijaya F.C. players
NK Vinogradar players
Croatian Football League players
Swiss Super League players
Belgian Pro League players
Allsvenskan players
Liga I players
Persian Gulf Pro League players
Singapore Premier League players
Liga 1 (Indonesia) players
Croatian expatriate footballers
Expatriate footballers in Belgium
Expatriate footballers in Switzerland
Expatriate footballers in Sweden
Expatriate footballers in Romania
Expatriate footballers in Iran
Expatriate footballers in Singapore
Expatriate footballers in Indonesia
Croatian expatriate sportspeople in Belgium
Croatian expatriate sportspeople in Switzerland
Croatian expatriate sportspeople in Sweden
Croatian expatriate sportspeople in Romania
Croatian expatriate sportspeople in Iran
Croatian expatriate sportspeople in Indonesia
Croatian expatriate sportspeople in Singapore